Crooked Teeth may refer to:
 Malocclusion, a misalignment or incorrect relation between teeth
 "Crooked Teeth" (Death Cab for Cutie song), 2006
 Crooked Teeth (album), a 2017 album by Papa Roach
 "Crooked Teeth" (Papa Roach song)